Yuwa uses girls’ team sports as a platform for social development in rural India. Yuwa  is one of the largest girls’ football programs in India, with 250 players, 150 of whom practice daily. In 2009 Franz Gastler founded Yuwa with the financial help of his high school friends, Greg Deming, Stephen Peterson, and Erik Odland, to use football as a platform to combat child marriage, illiteracy and human trafficking among girls in rural India.

Details

History 
Vision statement: 'Yuwa, which means "youth" in Hindi, works specifically with girls from impoverished families in rural Jharkhand, India—a place where girls are at risk of child marriage and human trafficking. It is a program that uses team sports and education to build character, confidence, and courage. It is a place where girls who don't yet know their worth can meet to compete, achieve goals, and create brighter futures. Yuwa prepares girls to break the cycle of poverty—permanently' (Yuwa About).

Franz Gastler has given TEDx talks on "Sports to promote confidence in women" (2012), "The Girl Effect" (2013)  and with Rinky Kumari "Yuwa - How football can change lives" (2015).

The program was featured as a Microsoft Edge Partner, November 16, 2017, highlighting the new Yuwa web page.  The News & Media page has a list of media articles describing Yuwa.

Donosti Cup football tournament 

Participation in the 2013 tournament helped Yuwa achieve recognition in India.  Their participation in the 2016 tournament in Spain was featured in a short series of four videos by the Bollywood star Ranbir Kapoor. They were the second team invited to the 2018 25th Anniversary tournament.

Awards 
Yuwa won the Laureus Sport for Good Award in 2019.

References

External links
 

Sports organisations of India
Rural development in India
Women's sports organizations